The Copa Premier Honor Argentino or the Copa Honor Argentino was an international football friendly competition contested by Argentina and Uruguay national teams. All games were played in Buenos Aires. It was held in ten occasions between 1908 and 1920.

History
In 1912, 1913 and 1914 the Argentina teams were selected by the breakaway "Federación Argentina de Football rather than the official body, Asociación Argentina de Football (AFA). Outside the British Home Championship, Argentina–Uruguay is one of the oldest fixtures in international football. During the 1910s and 1920s they regularly played each other up to four times a year. 

In addition to South American Championship matches, the Copa Premier Honor Argentino was one of several trophies the two national teams regularly competed for during that era. Others included the Copa Premier Honor Uruguayo, which was played in Montevideo, the Copa Lipton and the Copa Newton.

List of champions

Finals
The following list includes all the editions of the Copa Premier Honor Argentino:

Titles by country

All-time scorers

Most finals by player
7:  Cayetano Saporiti (won 3)
6:  Alfredo Foglino (won 1),  José Piendibene (won 3)
5:  Angel Romano (won 2) 
4:  Pedro Calomino (won 3),  Pablo Dacal (won 2),  Alexander Watson Hutton (won 2)
3:  Juan Enrique Hayes (won 3),  Carlos Tomás Wilson (won 2),  Eliseo Brown (won 2)

See also
Copa Premier Honor Uruguayo
Copa Lipton
Copa Newton

References

p
p
p
p
p
1908 establishments
1920 disestablishments